The Belvidere & Delaware River Railway Company  also known as Delaware River Railroad is a class III railroad in the United States. It was formed in 1995 when the Conrail Delaware Secondary line was purchased by the Black River Railroad System, which operates several railroad services in western New Jersey and eastern Pennsylvania. The Black River Railroad System also owns and operates the Black River & Western Railroad (BR&W). BR&W leases 10 miles of track to BDRV since 2004. Trackage purchased was a segment of the original Belvidere Delaware Railroad, later controlled by the Pennsylvania Railroad and ultimately Penn Central.

The main operation of BDRV is freight service south along the Delaware River from Phillipsburg to Carpentersville, a distance of 7 miles along the scenic Delaware River in New Jersey. Much of the industry currently is lumber and stone. Service is provided thrice weekly. BDRV originally served the James River Paper plant in Milford, New Jersey, assuming the task from Conrail: service to the plant ended in July 2003 when the plant closed. Rail service to a lumber transload continued serving Milford into 2004 when service on this part of the line was finally terminated. Freight service to Corrugated Paper Group (now Georgia Pacific) in nearby Riegelsville, New Jersey terminated in 2005 when the firm switched from railroad to trucking for product shipment.

BDRV interchanges with Norfolk Southern Railway (NS) in Phillipsburg, which provides connections to the national rail network. Commercial agreements also provide a connection with the Canadian Pacific Railway (CP) at Allentown, Pennsylvania. BDRV is a NS handling carrier, meaning NS haulage rates include delivery to BDRV customers by BDRV.

Passenger Excursions

In 2004, the New York, Susquehanna & Western Railway (NYS&W) Technical & Historical Society, in partnership with BDRV, began operating Phillipsburg–Carpentersville steam-powered excursions. Service was extended as far as Riegelsville, Pennsylvania in 2016, utilizing former NYS&W locomotive No. 142. No. 142 is a China Railways SY type 2-8-2 Mikado steam locomotive built by the Tangshan locomotive works in 1989 for the Valley Railroad in Essex, Connecticut as Valley No. 1647, and sold to NYS&W in 1992. The locomotive was renumbered No. 142, and operated mainline excursions on NYS&W. The locomotive was brought out of storage by BDRV in 2004 for use on the excursions. NYS&W Technical & Historical Society operates their trains under the banner name "Delaware River Railroad Excursions".

Out of service
NYS&W Technical & Historical Society began clearing the line of vegetation south of Carpentersville, eventually reaching Milford in late 2010. The line south of Carpentersville sees limited service though track gangs frequent the trackage on rail speeders. The borough of Milford has a yearly event called "Milford Alive" which has included rail speeder rides on the line. There are future plans to restore regular train service to the Riegelsville and Milford when track conditions have been further upgraded.

References

External links

Official website

New Jersey railroads
Pennsylvania railroads
Spin-offs of Conrail
Railway companies established in 1995
Phillipsburg, New Jersey
American companies established in 1995
Heritage railroads in New Jersey